Meykhvaran-e Mohammad Aqa (also Romanized as Meykhvārān-e Moḩammad Āqā, Meykhowrān-e Moḩammad Āqā, and Meykhvorān-e Moḩammad Āqā; also known as Maikhorané Mohammad Aghā, Mey Khārān, Meykhowrān-e Pā’īn, and Meykhvorān) is a village in Bavaleh Rural District, in the Central District of Sonqor County, Kermanshah Province, Iran. At the 2006 census, its population was 292, in 60 families.

References 

Populated places in Sonqor County